NRG Park, formerly Reliant Park and Astrodomain, is a complex in Houston, named after the energy company NRG Energy. It is located on Kirby Drive at the South Loop West Freeway (I-610). This complex of buildings encompasses  of land and consists of four venues: NRG Stadium, NRG Center, NRG Arena and the NRG Astrodome.

The complex hosts many sporting  events and conventions each year, the largest of which are Houston Texans home games, and the Houston Livestock Show and Rodeo.

The complex is served by the Stadium Park / Astrodome station, a light rail station on the Red Line of the METRORail light rail system. It also includes one of the world's largest parking lots (holding 26,000 total) and sees nearly 750 events yearly. Until 2005, the lot also served as a parking lot for Six Flags Astroworld, which has since closed. Since 2018, it served as the site of the Astroworld Festival, an annual music festival run by Travis Scott, which became the site of a deadly crowd crush in 2021.

NRG Stadium

NRG Stadium, home to the Houston Texans and the Houston Livestock Show and Rodeo, was the home of Super Bowl XXXVIII (held February 1, 2004), where the New England Patriots defeated the Carolina Panthers 32-29 and where the Super Bowl XXXVIII halftime show controversy took place. The stadium also hosted Super Bowl LI (held February 5, 2017), also won by the Patriots after storming back from down 25 points to the Atlanta Falcons, winning 34-28 in overtime. NRG Stadium hosted WrestleMania XXV on April 5, 2009 with a sellout attendance of 72,774 and a live gate of $6.9 million.

The stadium was the first NFL stadium with a retractable roof and natural grass.  The stadium can be configured to utilize a  space for general session, catered functions, exhibits, concerts, and much more. In addition, NRG Stadium offers four massive concourse levels for special events.  The design of the stadium roof provides a very flexible rigging configuration for major audio and visual presentations. 200 suites complement NRG Stadium.

NRG Center

The NRG Center is a convention center located among the sports venues in NRG Park. It opened in 2002 and hosts various events year-round, including portions of the Houston Livestock Show and Rodeo, who maintains its offices on the second floor of the building. It runs over ¼ mile in length.

NRG Center is equipped with a technological infrastructure capable of providing high-speed internet access, pre-wired fiber optic cabling backbone, on-site production facilities, 120 television monitors, and web-casting abilities. Exclusive services include on-site support from telephone and internet, electrical, food and beverage, rigging, security and event staffing. Each meeting room has its own dedicated sound, lighting and networking capabilities.

Along with the Houston Livestock Show and Rodeo, NRG Center hosts some of the largest conventions and trade shows in Houston. Some examples of these events are the Offshore Technology Conference, Nutcracker Market, Houston Auto Show, International Gem & Jewelry Show, Houston Gun Collector's and Antique Show, and the Houston Boat, Sport and Travel Show - to name a few.

NRG Arena

The NRG Arena, formerly known as the "Astro Arena", is a  sports center. It was completed in 1971 and located adjacent to the Astro Hall (later renamed the Reliant Hall), which was later demolished in May 2002 to make room for more parking. The Arena has been the home of several different events, including the Houston Hotshots, Houston's former indoor soccer team and smaller wrestling events such as WCW Thunder.

Some of the latest events to come through NRG Arena are the And 1 Mix Tape Tour, Hannah Montana, The Cheetah Girls, and Sesame Street Live.

NRG Astrodome

The NRG Astrodome, formerly known as just the Houston Astrodome, is called the "Eighth Wonder of the World" by many as it is the first domed structure of its size created without a pillar supporting it in the center. The Astrodome opened for business on April 9, 1965 and was the home of the Houston Astros and Houston Oilers for over 30 years before both teams moved out, the former to Minute Maid Park and the latter to Nashville, Tennessee (where they eventually became the Tennessee Titans). The Astrodome has been the home of many other special events, including the Republican National Convention, the NBA All-Star Game, and World Wrestling Federation (WWF) WrestleMania X-Seven. The venue has also seen the likes of historic recording artists such as Elvis Presley.  Until 2002, NRG Astrodome was also the host of the Houston Livestock Show and Rodeo, the largest of its kind in the world. The last concert in NRG Astrodome was the largest attended event ever in the building, featuring George Strait on March 3, 2002 at the Livestock Show and Rodeo where he sang to 68,266 people.

The Astrodome (and NRG Park in general) gained nationwide attention in September 2005 when it was opened as a massive shelter for refugees fleeing Hurricane Katrina. Each building except for NRG Stadium (which was configured for the Houston Texans) hosted several thousand refugees, and local media dubbed the complex "Reliant City". This "city" was itself evacuated when Hurricane Rita threatened Texas later that month, but many returned after the scare and moved out shortly before the end of the year.

The Astrodome has been closed to the general public since 2008 because of fire code violations, and was to undergo renovations in October 2018 to become a multi-purpose event center. The floor of the stadium would have been raised and would have created over 1,000+ parking spaces, while the top floor would be used for events. The project was supposed to start in October 2018 and be completed sometime in 2020. Harris County was to spend $105 million in order to complete this massive overhaul. However, the renovations were rescheduled  to 2019, and then put on hold, and then all together scrapped.

MDAnderson Cancer Center Speedway at NRG Park

The MDAnderson Cancer Center Speedway at NRG Park is a temporary street circuit that is configured throughout NRG Park's parking lot. The speedway hosted the Grand Prix of Houston, a Champ Car race held in 2006 and 2007. The pit lane and paddock for the race teams were located in NRG Arena.  Due to the merger between Champ Car and the Indy Racing League in 2008, the 2008 Grand Prix of Houston was canceled.

On March 28, 2012, the Verizon IndyCar Series announced that Grand Prix of Houston would return in 2013 to the temporary circuit in NRG Park. The first race since the merger was a doubleheader and the races were won by Scott Dixon and Will Power. The weekend also featured a horrible accident in the second race, Dario Franchitti & Takuma Sato made contact in turn 5 on the last lap making Franchitti airborne hitting the catchfence similar to Kenny Brack's incident in 2003 at Texas. The accident injured 13 fans from flying debris. The race returned in June 2014 with safety upgrades for both drivers and fans featuring updated fencing and grandstands were removed from where the 2013 accident happened. Carlos Huertas & Simon Pagenaud won the 2 Verizon indyCar Series races of the weekend.

The track was sponsored by JAGFlo in 2007.

Lap Records
The fastest official race lap records at Houston-NRG Park (JAGFlo Speedway at Reliant Park) are listed as:

References

External links

 NRG Park Homepage
 Grand Prix of Houston Homepage
 RacingCircuit.info's history of the Reliant Park Grand Prix circuit

Astroworld Festival crowd crush
Sports complexes in the United States
Sports venues in Harris County, Texas
Sports venues in Houston